The Girl on the Bridge is a 1951 American film noir crime film cowritten and directed by Hugo Haas. It stars Haas, Beverly Michaels and Robert Dane. The film' sets were designed by the art director Vin Taylor.

Plot

A kindly elderly watchmaker, who lost his family in the holocaust, sees a beautiful young blonde on a bridge and prevents her from committing suicide. They marry and live happily until a man from her past attempts to blackmail her.

Cast
 Hugo Haas as David Toman
 Beverly Michaels as Clara Barker 
 Robert Dane as Mario Venti
 John Close as Harry Olson (as Johnny Close)
 Anthony Jochim as Jonathan Cooper
 Judy Clark as Blonde Doll
 Darr Smith as Husband
 Maria Bibikov as Young Wife (as Maria Bibikoff)
 Dick Pinner as Prosecutor (as Richard Pinner)

References

External links
 
 
 

1951 films
Film noir
American black-and-white films
1950s English-language films
20th Century Fox films
1951 romantic drama films
American romantic drama films
1950s American films